Claude LaBrosse (born August 31, 1934) is a Canadian retired professional ice hockey defenceman. His professional career spanned 16 years, from 1956 to 1971.

Following the 1960–61 season, in which the Rochester Americans failed to qualify for the playoffs, the Montreal Canadiens transferred their working agreement to the Quebec Aces of the American Hockey League and sent Rochester players LaBrosse and Guy Rousseau to Quebec. Rochester re-acquired LaBrosse for the 1968–69 AHL season by purchasing his rights from the Phoenix Roadrunners.

References

External links
 

1934 births
Living people
Canadian expatriate ice hockey players in the United States
Canadian ice hockey defencemen
Chicoutimi Saguenéens (QSHL) players
Des Moines Oak Leafs players
Hull-Ottawa Canadiens players
Ice hockey people from Quebec
Phoenix Roadrunners (WHL) players
Quebec Aces (AHL) players
Rochester Americans players
Shawinigan-Falls Cataracts (QSHL) players
Victoria Maple Leafs players